George William Rochester (August 28, 1899 –  September 17, 1984) was a member of the California State Assembly for the 75th district from 1927 to 1929 and served in the California State Senate for the 37th district from 1929 to 1933. During World War I he served in the United States Navy Reserve.

He sponsored California's gin marriage law, which passed in 1928.

References

United States Navy personnel of World War I
Republican Party members of the California State Assembly
20th-century American politicians
1899 births
1984 deaths
United States Navy reservists